A drop-back pass or dropping back to pass is a passing style employed in American football in which the quarterback initially takes a three-step drop, backpedaling into the pocket to make a pass. It is the most common way of passing the ball in gridiron football. Kinds include a three-step drop, a five-step drop, and a seven-step drop.

References

American football terminology